FRSO may stand for:

 Finnish Radio Symphony Orchestra
 Frankfurt Radio Symphony Orchestra
 Freedom Road Socialist Organization
 the French-speaking league of the Belgian Orienteering Federation (Fédération Régionale des Sports d'Orientation)